JOM is a technical journal devoted to exploring the many aspects of materials, science and engineering published monthly by The Minerals, Metals & Materials Society (TMS) (a member-based professional society). JOM reports scholarly work that explores the many aspects of materials science and engineering within the broad topical areas of light metals, structural materials, functional materials, extraction and processing, and materials processing and manufacturing. JOM strives to balance the interests of the laboratory and the marketplace by reporting academic, industrial, and government-sponsored work from around the world.

History
From 1949 through 1988, the journal was named Journal of Metals. With materials systems becoming commonplace and with the journal frequently covering composites, plastics, and other materials, its name was changed to JOM. It is published by TMS, which is headquartered in Pittsburgh, Pennsylvania.

References

External links 
 JOM home page
 Open-access JOM articles

Monthly magazines published in the United States
Materials science journals
Engineering magazines
Magazines established in 1949
Magazines published in Pittsburgh
Science and technology magazines published in the United States